The following details the Australia men's national soccer team results in competitive and also non-competitive (friendly) matches. Games are listed in chronological order, grouped by decade and year, from 1980 to 1999. The matches at the 1980 OFC Nations Cup are not counted as full internationals apart from the match against Papua New Guinea as they were the only team recognised as a FIFA member.

1980s

1980

1981

1982

1983

1984

1985

1986

1987

1988

1989

1990s

1990

1991

1992

1993

1994

1995

1996

1997

1998

References

External links
 Australian Results

Australia national soccer team results
1980 in Australian soccer
1981 in Australian soccer
1982 in Australian soccer
1983 in Australian soccer
1984 in Australian soccer
1985 in Australian soccer
1986 in Australian soccer
1987 in Australian soccer
1988 in Australian soccer
1989 in Australian soccer
1990 in Australian soccer
1991 in Australian soccer
1992 in Australian soccer
1993 in Australian soccer
1994 in Australian soccer
1995 in Australian soccer
1996 in Australian soccer
1997 in Australian soccer
1998 in Australian soccer